Jesper Rönnbäck (born 1 February 1974) is a Swedish freestyle skier. He competed in the men's moguls event at the 1998 Winter Olympics.

References

External links
 

1974 births
Living people
Swedish male freestyle skiers
Olympic freestyle skiers of Sweden
Freestyle skiers at the 1998 Winter Olympics
People from Kiruna Municipality
Sportspeople from Norrbotten County
20th-century Swedish people